Elizabeth Lawrence (May 5, 1904 – June 11, 1985), was an American horticulture writer and landscape architect. In 1932, she became the first woman to graduate with a degree in Landscape Architecture from (present-day) North Carolina State University. She is best known for her columns and books on Southern gardening. Lawrence wrote for House & Garden, The American Home, and Southern Home and Garden, and more than 700 columns for The Charlotte Observer.

Her home in Charlotte, North Carolina, the Elizabeth Lawrence House and Garden is recognized by the National Register of Historic Places and is part of the Wing Haven Gardens and Bird Sanctuary.

Bibliography

Books
A Southern Garden: A Handbook for the Middle South (1942)
A Rock Garden in the South (1956)
The Little Bulbs: A Tale of Two Gardens (1957)
Gardens in Winter (1971)
Lob's Wood (1971)

Posthumous publications
Gardening for Love: The Market Bulletins (1987)
A Garden of One's Own (1997)
Two Gardeners: A Friendship in Letters (2002)

Collections
Through the Garden Gate (1990), a collection of her weekly gardening column for The Charlotte Observer (1957-1971)
Beautiful at All Seasons: Southern Gardening and Beyond (2007)

References

External links
A Southern garden, a handbook for the middle South (full text)
Elizabeth Lawrence House and Garden

1904 births
1984 deaths
North Carolina State University alumni
Barnard College alumni
Landscape architects
American landscape architects
American landscape and garden designers
American writers
American women writers
American women columnists
20th-century American women
20th-century American people